This article contains a table listing by elevation, mountains of the Alps that are between 2000 and 2499 metres high and which also have a topographic prominence of at least . The list is a continuation of the List of prominent mountains of the Alps (2500–2999 m) and List of prominent mountains of the Alps above 3000 m, which contains an introduction with statistics and an explanation of the criteria.

Mountains of the Alps between 2000 and 2500 m

See also 

List of mountains of the Alps (2500–2999 m)
List of Alpine three-thousanders
List of Alpine four-thousanders
List of Alpine peaks by prominence
List of the highest mountains in Austria
List of the highest mountains in Germany 
List of mountains in Slovenia 
List of mountains of Switzerland

Notes

References

Sources
Jonathan de Ferranti & Eberhard Jurgalski's map-checked ALPS TO R589m and rough, computer-generated EUROPE TO R150m lists 
Christian Thöni's list of 8875 summits in Switzerland
Mark Trengrove and Clem Clements'  list of German alps above 2000 m,
Mark Trengrove's lists of several regions of the French Alps.

2000 m
Alps